Carex atrosquama, the lesser blackscale sedge, is a species of sedge that was first formally named by Kenneth Mackenzie in 1912. It is native to the northwestern United States and western Canada, from Alaska south to Utah and Colorado. It grows in alpine and subalpine meadows, as well as along rivers and streams in gravelly areas.

References

atrosquama
Flora of North America
Plants described in 1912